Benjakitti Park is a public park in the Khlong Toei District of central Bangkok; situated next to the Queen Sirikit National Convention Center.  It is close to Queen Sirikit National Convention Centre MRT Station, Sukhumvit MRT Station and Asok BTS Station.

History
It was officially opened in 2004 (on land formally owned by the Tobacco Authority of Thailand) to honor the 72nd birthday of Queen Sirikit. Before that, it had been in operation since 1992, the year the Queen turned 60 (5th cycle), hence the name "Bejakitti" (5 cycles). The name "Benjakitti" was given by Queen Sirikit during the opening. Benjakitti Park has a landmark symbol called “Pathumthani” near the pond. Benjakitti Park was developed from Tobacco pond area 200x800 meters, built by digging and reclamation. This park was part of the project replacement area from resolutions in the government of Prime Minister Anand Panyarachun.

Between 1 and 9 December 2014, this park was used for performing theater and a spectacular technique to commemorate the King "The Phra Mahathat The Phenomenal Life Show" by the stage in the middle of the pond over 100 meters which is the longest water stage in the country.  It includes a central boating lake, an outdoor exercise area, a cycling track and a path that is used by walkers and joggers; bicycles and boats can be hired in the park.

Expansion to Benjakitti Forest Park 

A major expansion of the park was approved in 2006, with land granted from the Tobacco Monopoly to build Benjakitti Forest Park to celebrate Queen Sirikit's birthday in 2006. The 652-million baht expansion makes Benjakitti Park the first park in Bangkok with a forest park, and expands the size of the park to 72 hectares. Facilities include elevated walkways, wetlands, rare plant areas, cycle paths and an outdoor amphitheatre. The expansion fully opened in 2022.   

The park is bridged to another public park, Lumphini Park by the 1.3 km long National Sports Development Fund-Sports Authority of Thailand (NSDF-SAT) Park, an elevated pedestrian walkway and bicycle trail at the southwest corner of the park.

References 

Parks in Bangkok
2004 establishments in Thailand
Khlong Toei district